was a Japanese novelist in the police procedural genre.

Career
Nishimura is best known for his "train series" mysteries, most of which feature his characters, police detectives Shozo Totsugawa, Sadao Kamei and Tokitaka Honda. He won the Mystery Writers of Japan Award in 1981 for The Terminal Murder Case.

Nishimura was married to Mizue Yajima. He died from liver cancer on 3 March 2022, at the age of 91.

Works in English translation
Novel
The Mystery Train Disappears (original title: Misuterī Ressha ga Kieta), trans. Gavin Frew (New York: Dembner Books, 1990) 

Short story collection
The Isle of South Kamui and Other Stories (original title: Minami Kamuito), trans. Ginny Tapley Takemori (Thames River Press, 2013) 

Short story
The Kindly Blackmailer  (original title: Yasashii Kyōhakusha) ("Ellery Queen's Japanese Golden Dozen: The Detective Story World in Japan" anthology.  Edited by Ellery Queen.  Rutland Vermont: Charles E. Tuttle Co. Inc.  1978.    pp 147–165)

Awards
 1965 – Edogawa Rampo Prize: Tenshi no Shōkon (A Scar of an Angel)
 1981 – Mystery Writers of Japan Award for Best Novel: Tāminaru Satsujin Jiken (The Terminal Murder Case)

TV
Kyotaro Nishimura Travel Mystery
Kyotaro Nishimura Suspense -Susumu Samonji
Inspector Totsugawa Series

References

External links 
 J'Lit | Authors : Kyotaro Nishimura | Books from Japan 

1930 births
2022 deaths
Japanese writers
Japanese mystery writers
Writers from Tokyo
20th-century Japanese novelists
21st-century Japanese novelists
Mystery Writers of Japan Award winners
Edogawa Rampo Prize winners
Deaths from liver cancer
Deaths from cancer in Japan